Neil or Neal Morgan may refer to:

Neil Morgan, owner of Ninfa's
Neil Morgan, character in Cuckoo (TV series)
Neal Morgan, musician
Neal Morgan Jr., American writer
Neil Morgan, co-founder of Voice of San Diego and former editor of the San Diego Tribune